Michal Lobkowicz (born 1964) is a former Czech politician and member of the Lobkowicz family. In 1998, he briefly served as defense minister in the cabinet of Josef Tošovský, at the age of 34, becoming the Czech Republic's youngest defense minister. He was a member of Civic Democratic Party but left it for Freedom Union due to its financial scandal, leaving politics in 2002.

References

1964 births
Living people
Defence ministers of the Czech Republic
Civic Democratic Party (Czech Republic) MPs
Freedom Union – Democratic Union MPs
Members of the Chamber of Deputies of the Czech Republic (1996–1998)
Members of the Chamber of Deputies of the Czech Republic (1998–2002)
Charles University alumni